Kashif Daud (born 10 February 1986) is a Pakistani cricketer who now represents the United Arab Emirates cricket team. In domestic cricket in Pakistan, he played in 33 first-class and 20 List A matches for Sialkot and Zarai Taraqiati Bank Limited. In January 2021, he was named in the UAE's One Day International (ODI) squad to play against Ireland. He made his ODI debut for the UAE, against Ireland, on 8 January 2021.

In October 2021, he was named in the UAE's Twenty20 International (T20I) squad for the 2021 Summer T20 Bash tournament. He made his T20I debut on 5 October 2021, for the UAE against Namibia.

Personal life
Daud was born in Sialkot, Pakistan. He was introduced to UAE cricket by his friend, fellow Sialkoti and UAE national player Mohammed Qasim. In 2016 he moved to the UAE to work as a coach at Sharjah Cricket Stadium.

References

External links
 

1986 births
Living people
Pakistani cricketers
Emirati cricketers
United Arab Emirates One Day International cricketers
United Arab Emirates Twenty20 International cricketers
Sialkot cricketers
Zarai Taraqiati Bank Limited cricketers
Cricketers from Sialkot
Pakistani emigrants to the United Arab Emirates
Pakistani expatriate sportspeople in the United Arab Emirates